Nephotettix cincticeps, the rice green leafhopper, is a species of true bug in the family Cicadellidae. It is a pest of barnyard millet. It is a key insect vector transmitting rice dwarf virus (RDV) that causes rice dwarf disease.

References

Chiasmini
Insect pests of millets